Raphitoma densa is a species of sea snail, a marine gastropod mollusk in the family Raphitomidae.

Description
The length of the shell varies between 9 mm and 12 mm.

Distribution
This species occurs in the Western and Central Mediterranean Sea.

References

 Nordsieck F. (1977). The Turridae of the European seas. Roma: La Conchiglia. 131 pp.

External links
 Monterosato T. A. (di) (1884). Nomenclatura generica e specifica di alcune conchiglie mediterranee. Palermo, Virzi, 152 pp
 Locard A. (1891). Les coquilles marines des côtes de France. Annales de la Société Linnéenne de Lyon. 37: 1-385
 Gastropods.com: Raphitoma densa
 
 Giannuzzi-Savelli R., Pusateri F. & Bartolini S. (2018). A revision of the Mediterranean Raphitomidae (Gastropoda, Conoidea), 7: on the sibling species Raphitoma densa (Monterosato, 1884) and R. griseomaculata n. sp. Biodiversity Journal. 9(4): 429-440

densa
Gastropods described in 1884